Jalmari is a Finnish male given name which derives from the Old Norse male name Hjalmar or Hjálmarr (hjalmr 'helmet' + arr 'warrior/army').

Notable people with the name Jalmari include:

Jalmari Eskola (1886–1958), Finnish athlete of cross country
Jalmari Haapanen (1882–1961), Finnish politician
Jalmari Helander (born in 1976), Finnish screenwriter and film director
Jalmari Holopainen (1892–1954), Finnish footballer
Jalmari Jaakkola (1885–1964), Finnish historian and professeur
Jalmari Kivenheimo (1889–1994), Finnish gymnast
Jalmari Kovanen (1877–1936), Finnish politician
Jalmari Linna (1891–1954), Finnish politician
Jalmari Malmi (1893–1943), Finnish politician
Jalmari Parikka (1891–1959), Finnish revolutionary soldier
Jalmari Rötkö (1892–1938), Finnish politician
Jalmari Ruokokoski (1886–1936), Finnish Expressionist painter
Jalmari Sauli (1889–1957), Finnish writer and athlete
Jalmari Väisänen (1893–1983), Finnish politician
Jalmari Viljanen (1872–1928), Finnish politician

See also
Kaarlo Jalmari Tuominen (1908–2006), Finnish runner athlete

Finnish masculine given names